Bristol was a European Parliament constituency centred on Bristol in England, but covering much of Avon. Until 1984, it included parts of southern Gloucestershire and northwestern Wiltshire.

Prior to its uniform adoption of proportional representation in 1999, the United Kingdom used first-past-the-post for the European elections in England, Scotland and Wales. The European Parliament constituencies used under that system were smaller than the later regional constituencies and only had one Member of the European Parliament each.

When it was created in England in 1979, it consisted of the Westminster Parliament constituencies of Bristol North East, Bristol North West, Bristol South, Bristol South East, Bristol West, Chippenham, Kingswood, and South Gloucestershire. In 1984, it was redrawn to consist of Bath, Bristol East, Bristol North West, Bristol South, Bristol West, Kingswood, Northavon, and Wansdyke. In 1994, it consisted of Bristol East, Bristol North West, Bristol South, Bristol West, Kingswood, Northavon, and Woodspring.

The seat became part of the much larger South West England constituency in 1999.

Members of the European Parliament

Results

References

External links
 David Boothroyd's United Kingdom Election Results 

European Parliament constituencies in England (1979–1999)
Politics of Bristol
1979 establishments in England
1984 disestablishments in England
Constituencies established in 1979
Constituencies disestablished in 1984